Teen-Age Strangler is a 1964 American independent crime drama film directed by Ben Parker. It was made in Huntington, West Virginia. It was re-released in black & white in 1990, resulting in local screenings, newspaper writeups, and cast reunions. It has become a cult film ever since  it was featured on an episode of the TV series Mystery Science Theater 3000.

Summary
It exploits the popular concern with juvenile delinquency as a serial killer is on the loose baffling policemen. Their main suspects are mostly a gang of street racers with one of them, Jimmy, never having an alibi. Even though he's innocent, a can of worms opens as Jimmy's life is thrown into chaos.

MST3K appearance
It was featured on a Season 5 episode of Mystery Science Theater 3000 (MST3K).  Actor John Humphreys, who played the role of "Mikey" appeared at the MST3K first Conventio-Con in September, 1994.

Video and DVD releases 
Teen-Age Strangler was released by Sinister Cinema on VHS in 1990 as part of its "wild youth" roster.  
The film was released by Something Weird Video in 2001 with the movie Teenage Gang Debs as a DVD double feature. 
The MST3K version has been released by Rhino Home Video as part of the Collection, Volume 10 (out-of-print) on both Rhino's and Mst3k's official websites) and Collection, Volume 10.2 box sets.

References

External links
 
 
 Teenage Strangler on Amazon

1964 films
1964 crime drama films
1964 independent films
1960s crime thriller films
1960s English-language films
1960s rediscovered films
American crime drama films
American crime thriller films
American gang films
American independent films
American serial killer films
Films about juvenile delinquency
Films shot in West Virginia
Rediscovered American films
1960s American films